Events in the year 1981 in Germany.

Incumbents
President — Karl Carstens
Chancellor — Helmut Schmidt

Events
 13 - 24 February - 31st Berlin International Film Festival
 28 February - Germany in the Eurovision Song Contest 1981
 14 June - East German general election, 1981
 1 August — Launch of the MK2 Volkswagen Polo, which makes use of a larger estate-like bodyshell, although it is still marketed as a hatchback.
 23 September — Launch of the new Opel Ascona, which for the first time is available with a hatchback and front-wheel drive, as well as a new range of engines.
 29 October — Raiders of the Lost Ark in movie theaters in Germany.
 December — The Volkswagen Polo and Opel Ascona miss out on the European Car of the Year award, which instead goes to the Renault 9 from France.
 Date unknown - Museum für Moderne Kunst in Frankfurt was founded, although it was not opened to the public until 1991.

Science 
 Date unknown - German research team led by Peter Armbruster and Gottfried Münzenberg at the GSI Helmholtz Centre for Heavy Ion Research (GSI Helmholtzzentrum für Schwerionenforschung) in Darmstadt bombarded a target of bismuth-209 with accelerated nuclei of chromium-54 to produce 5 atoms of the isotope bohrium-262

Births 
 January 21 —  Dany Heatley, hockey player
 February 23 — Jan Böhmermann, television presenter
 March 8 - Timo Boll, table tennis player
 March 11 - Matthias Schweighöfer, actor
 March 12 - Friedrich Mücke, German actor
 April 26 - Teresa Weißbach, German actress
 April 27 — Sandy Mölling, pop singer
 May 15 - Ben, German singer
 May 21 - Maximilian Mutzke, drummer and singer
 June 3 - Timur Tekkal, rugby player
 June 12 - Nora Tschirner, German actress
 July 21 —  Stefan Schumacher, cyclist
 August 4 - Florian Silbereisen, singer
 August 18 - Jan Frodeno, triathlete
 August 22 - Christina Obergföll, athlete
 August 30 - André Niklaus, athlete
 September 7 - Hannah Herzsprung, actress
 October 2 - Ronald Rauhe, canoeist

Deaths
 8 January — Mortimer von Kessel, Wehrmacht general (born 1893)
 February 22 - Curtis Bernhardt, film director (born 1899)
 March 7 - Hilde Krahwinkel Sperling, German tennis player (born 1908)
 April 4 — Carl Ludwig Siegel, mathematician (born 1896)
 April 20 — Hans Söhnker, actor (born 1903)
 May 9 — Fritz Umgelter, television director, writer and film director (born 1922)
 May 13 - Joseph-Ernst Graf Fugger von Glött, German politician (born 1895)
 May 18 - Eleonore Baur, German Nazi, only woman to participate in Munich Beer Hall Putsch (born 1885)
 June 4 - Fritz Steuben, German author (born 1898)
 June 16 - Julius Ebbinghaus, German philosopher (born 1885)
 July 5 — Helmut Gröttrup, electrical engineer (born 1916)
 July 19 - Karl Steinhoff, German politician (born 1892)
 August 23 - Rolf Herricht, German actor and comedian (born 1927)
 October 29 - Carl Joseph Leiprecht, German bishop of Roman Catholic Church (born 1903)
 November 22 - Hans Adolf Krebs, German  physician and biochem (born 1900)
 December 31 — Gunther Krappe, Wehrmacht officer (born 1893)

See also
 1981 in German television

References

 
Years of the 20th century in Germany
1980s in Germany
Germany
Germany